Helvia is a genus of praying mantises in the family Hymenopodidae found in Southeast Asia. It is monotypic, being represented by the single species, Helvia cardinalis.

Taxonomy
Helvia cardinalis is known by various common names including yellow flower mantis and Davison's mantis. It is one of several species known as flower mantises due to their appearance and behaviour which gives them a camouflaged resemblance to flowers.

Description

This slender species is mainly plain yellow or greenish. The female (38 mm long) is much larger than the male, with three dark spots on the somewhat pointed wings.

See also 
 List of mantis genera and species
 Flower mantis

References 

Hymenopodidae
Mantodea of Southeast Asia
Insects of Laos
Insects of Malaysia
Insects of Thailand
Insects of Vietnam
Insects of Myanmar
Insects of Cambodia
Insects of Singapore